Dentistry in Israel is taught at two dental schools  and several post-graduate training centers.

Dental schools 
 Hebrew University-Hadassah School of Dental Medicine in Jerusalem, founded by the Alpha Omega fraternity
 Tel Aviv University School of Dental Medicine in Tel Aviv

Dental training centers include Rambam Health Care Campus in Haifa and Barzilai Medical Center in Ashkelon. Post-graduate programs of the Sheba Medical Center in Tel Hashomer are run by the Medical Corps of the Israel Defense Forces.

Overview 
With 7,500 practicing dentists and close to 300 new dentists joining the profession each year, Israel has one of the highest proportions of dentists to the general population in the world. Around 85% of all dentists in Israel work in private clinics or group practice. There are 5,000 private dental clinics in Israel as well as 200 clinics operated by the health funds.

Israel has 60 companies that manufacture dental supplies and equipment, including dental labs and implants, X-rays, attachments, polishers, mixers, bur sets and diamond instruments.

Dental research 
The human encoding gene for tuftelin (TUFT1) was cloned by Dany Deutsch and Aharon Palmon of the Hadassah School of Dental Medicine.

See also 
Health care in Israel
List of medical schools in Israel
Dentistry throughout the world
American Dental Volunteers for Israel

References 

 

he:רפואת שיניים#רפואת השיניים בישראל